Kiesa Rae Ellestad (born January 16, 1989), known professionally as Kiesza, is a Canadian singer and multi-instrumentalist from Calgary.
In 2017, she was involved in a car accident in Toronto, suffering severe injuries that required her to take several years off to recover. To date, she has released the albums Sound of a Woman (2014) and Crave (2020).

Early life
Kiesza was born and raised in Calgary. Her last name, Ellestad, is Norwegian from her paternal side and her grandfather is from Fagernes in Norway. In an interview with Metro, Kiesza claimed that she can trace her lineage to someone who fought alongside Robert the Bruce at the Battle of Bannockburn, elaborating, "There's a lot of Scottish people in Canada. Tons. My grandpa was of Scottish heritage—he was of the black Douglases".

At 13, Kiesza took a sailing class at summer camp, and continued her interest past age 16, when she took part in the Sail and Life Training Society (SALTS)  program. She later became a sailing instructor at the Glenmore Sailing School in 2007. A year after, she joined the reserves of the Royal Canadian Navy along with her brother, becoming a NavCom (Naval Communicator). It was while she was at crew singalongs at the Navy that she taught herself to play guitar.

Meanwhile, she also entered the Miss Universe Canada pageant. She stated that her time in the Navy motivated her to give away 4,500 CDs to Canadian troops serving in Afghanistan in 2008. Kiesza took part in the Young Canadians, where she trained in jazz and tap dancing, as well as theatre. She also trained as a ballerina, but a knee injury at age 15 ended her ballet career. When Kiesza was 18, she said that her parents' divorce inspired her to write her first song as a way of expressing her feelings. The same year, she heard a song of hers played on the radio.

Music career

2006–2013: Career beginnings

In 2005, CKUA Folk Routes host Tom Coxworth selected Kiesza to perform for a live audience and to be broadcast live on his radio show. Shortly after, she was accepted to Selkirk College in Nelson, BC, where she studied keyboard, voice, and guitar. Next, Kiesza won a scholarship to attend Berklee College of Music in Boston, Massachusetts. Afterward, she went to New York City in 2010 to advance her music career. Although she started as mainly a folk singer, after attending Berklee and then living in New York, she moved to a more "uptempo sound", for which she worked with producer Rami Samir Afuni. In 2010, she was selected to play at the Canada Day celebrations at Trafalgar Square in London to 30,000 people.

In 2012, Kiesza released her first single after starting work with Afuni in New York, a "disco-infused pop" song titled "Oops", about a couple that had unprotected sex. She labelled her style of music at the time as "SteamPop", described by AjanWrites as "a flaming brew of bold, boisterous pop filled with tongue-in-cheek lyrics". In a later 2014 interview, Kiesza said "Oops" was made as a joke.

In 2013, the singer was featured in the single "Triggerfinger" by Norwegian band Donkeyboy. She has also written for other artists, such as Rihanna, Kylie Minogue, and Icona Pop.

2014–2016: Sound of a Woman

In February 2014, Kiesza released the video for her new single "Hideaway" through the label Lokal Legend. Idolator considered it unique for having a long take throughout the entire video, as Kiesza walked and danced through N 12th Street in Brooklyn, New York City. John Gentile of Rolling Stone called the style "impressive". Kiesza reported to Rolling Stone that she had trouble making the video, partly because she broke a rib just before filming, and "couldn't move for an entire month afterward." It was premiered by Annie Mac on her Mac's Special Delivery segment on BBC Radio 1. "Hideaway" debuted at number one on the UK Singles Chart.

Shortly after "Hideaway" charted, Kiesza released a new video for her cover of Haddaway's song "What Is Love". Mike Bell of the Calgary Herald referred to her version of the song as a "jaw-droppingly gorgeous cover of Haddaway's 1993 dance smash What Is Love?" She performed a slowed-down version, with a video showing her and others slowly revealed to be without clothes, to express "raw emotions".

Kiesza's second single, "Giant in My Heart", premiered on Annie Mac's BBC Radio 1 show on June 13, 2014. It entered the UK Singles Chart at number four.

Kiesza collaborated with Skrillex and Diplo on the song "Take Ü There", which was released as the first single from a collaborative mixtape between the two producers. She co-wrote Gorgon City's "Go All Night", featuring Jennifer Hudson singing her lyrics, which was on the British duo's debut album, Sirens.

Kiesza appeared as a guest on Duran Duran's album Paper Gods, released September 11, 2015.

She wrote several songs for Rihanna, which were considered for the Barbadian artist's eighth album. She also worked with Loreen on the 2015 single "I'm in It with You".

2017: Dearly Beloved, Malinkiesza, Phantom of the Dancefloor, and second album
Kiesza released the single "Dearly Beloved" on January 6, 2017. An accompanying music video, which showcases her with a white guitar, was posted on YouTube the same day through the KieszaVevo channel. According to the artist, the song and her future material were inspired by her "best friend Alice [who] passed away nearly a year and a half ago [as of 1/6/17]". The friend in question was Alicia Lemke, who had died in November 2015 from leukemia. On March 17, 2017, Pitbull released Climate Change, featuring a collaboration with Kiesza titled "We Are Strong". At the same time, Cerrone released the album RedLips, featuring a collaboration with Kiesza titled "Ain't No Party".

2017–present: Hiatus and return to performing in 2019
Nick Krewen, writing in the Toronto Star, reported that Kiesza was involved in a car accident in 2017 in Toronto, when an Uber vehicle she was in was struck by a taxi in a side collision. He reported that part of her recovery, from what she described as a traumatic brain injury, required her staying in a darkened room for six months.

After a two-year hiatus following the car crash, Kiesza released a new single, "Sweet Love," and returned to touring in June 2019. Paper magazine referred to the new song as being a "blend of genres".
In 2020, she released her second studio album, Crave.

According to Paper magazine, Kiesza is working on a musical.

Other ventures

In 2014, Kiesza was selected to be the face of a new line of fashion eyewear called "Color Block" by retailer Fendi, appearing in a promotional video shot by Ruth Hogben. The video "features Kiesza strolling on a treadmill against a painted skyline, while singing and donning the double-framed, colourful sunglasses." She announced plans to release her own line of fashion under the name "SteamPop" sometime in 2014.

Discography

 Sound of a Woman (2014)
 Crave (2020)

Tours
Headlining
 Sound of a Woman Tour (2015)
Opening act
 Demi World Tour (2014)
 The Artemis Tour (2021)

Awards and nominations

References

External links

 Official website
 Public Page VK
 

1989 births
21st-century Canadian guitarists
21st-century Canadian keyboardists
21st-century Canadian multi-instrumentalists
21st-century Canadian women singers
Berklee College of Music alumni
Canadian beauty pageant contestants
Canadian dance musicians
Canadian female dancers
Canadian people of Norwegian descent
Canadian people of Scottish descent
Canadian women pop singers
Canadian women singer-songwriters
Canadian women songwriters
Juno Award for Breakthrough Artist of the Year winners
Juno Award for Dance Recording of the Year winners
Juno Award for Video of the Year winners
Living people
Musicians from Calgary
Royal Canadian Navy personnel
21st-century women guitarists